Tuscan is a set of Italo-Dalmatian varieties of Romance spoken in Tuscany, Corsica, and Sardinia.

Standard Italian is based on Tuscan, specifically on its Florentine dialect, and it became the language of culture throughout Italy due to the prestige of the works by Dante Alighieri, Petrarch, Giovanni Boccaccio, Niccolò Machiavelli, and Francesco Guicciardini. It would later become the official language of all the Italian states and of the Kingdom of Italy when it was formed.

Subdialects

In De vulgari eloquentia ( 1300), Dante Alighieri distinguishes four main subdialects: fiorentino (Florence), senese (Siena), lucchese (Lucca) and aretino (Arezzo).

Tuscan is a dialect complex composed of many local variants, with minor differences among them.

The main subdivisions are between Northern Tuscan dialects, the Southern Tuscan dialects, and Corsican.

The Northern Tuscan dialects are (from east to west):
 Fiorentino, the main dialect of Florence, Chianti and the Mugello, also spoken in Prato and along the river Arno as far as the city of  Fucecchio.
 Pistoiese, spoken in the city of Pistoia and nearest zones (some linguists include this dialect in Fiorentino).
 Pesciatino or Valdinievolese, spoken in the Valdinievole zone, in the cities of Pescia and Montecatini Terme (some linguists include this dialect in Lucchese).
 Lucchese, spoken in Lucca and nearby hills (Lucchesia).
 Versiliese, spoken in the historical area of Versilia.
 Viareggino, spoken in Viareggio and vicinity.
 Pisano-Livornese, spoken in Pisa, in Livorno, and the vicinity, and along the coast from Livorno to Cecina.

The Southern Tuscan dialects are (from east to west):
 Aretino-Chianaiolo, spoken in Arezzo and the Valdichiana.
 Senese, spoken in the city and province of Siena.
 Grossetano, spoken in Grosseto and along the southern coast.
 Elbano, spoken on the island of Elba.

Corsican on the island of Corsica and the Corso-Sardinian transitional varieties spoken in northern Sardinia (Gallurese and Sassarese) are classified by scholars as a direct offshoot from medieval Tuscan, even though they now constitute a distinct linguistic group.

Speakers
Excluding the inhabitants of Province of Massa and Carrara, who speak an Emilian dialect, and people in the area of Tuscan Romagna, speaking Romagnol, around 3.5 million people speak Tuscan.

Dialectal features
Tuscan as a whole has certain defining features, with subvarieties that are distinguished by minor details.

Phonology

Tuscan gorgia
They are usually pronounced as fricatives in post-vocalic position when not blocked by the competing phenomenon of syntactic gemination:
  → 
  → 
  →

Weakening of G and C
A similar phonological alternation is the intervocalic weakening of the Italian "soft" g, the voiced affricate  (g as in judge) and "soft" c, the voiceless affricate  (ch as in church), known as attenuation, or, more commonly, as deaffrication.

Between vowels, the voiced post-alveolar affricate consonant is realized as voiced post-alveolar fricative (z of azure):

Similarly, the voiceless post-alveolar affricate is pronounced as a voiceless post-alveolar fricative between two vowels:

As a result of this weakening rule, there are a few minimal pairs distinguished only by length of the voiceless fricative (e.g.  lacerò 'it/he/she ripped' vs.  lascerò 'I will leave/let').

Affrication of S

However, since assimilation of the final consonant of the article to the following consonant tends to occur in exactly such cases (see "Masculine definite articles" below) the actual pronunciation will be usually . Affrication of  can more commonly be heard word-internally, as in falso (false)  → . This is a common phenomenon in Central Italy, but it is not exclusive to that area; for example it also happens in Switzerland (Canton Ticino).

No diphthongization of 
There are two Tuscan historical outcomes of Latin ŏ in stressed open syllables. Passing first through a stage , the vowel then develops as a diphthong . This phenomenon never gained universal acceptance, however, so that while forms with the diphthong came to be accepted as standard Italian (e.g. fuoco, buono, nuovo, duomo), the monophthong remains in popular speech (foco, bono, novo, domo).

Morphology

Accusative "te" for "tu"

A characteristic of Tuscan dialect is the use of the accusative pronoun te in emphatic clauses of the type "You! What are you doing here?".
 Standard Italian: tu lo farai, no? 'You'll do it, won't you?'
 Tuscan: Te lo farai, no?
 Standard Italian: tu, vieni qua! 'You, come here!'
 Tuscan: Te, vieni qua!

Double dative pronoun
A morphological phenomenon, cited also by Alessandro Manzoni in his masterpiece "I promessi sposi" (The Betrothed), is the doubling of the dative pronoun.

For the use of a personal pronoun as indirect object (to someone, to something), also called dative case, the standard Italian makes use of a construction preposition + pronoun a me (to me), or it makes use of a synthetic pronoun form, mi (to me). The Tuscan dialect makes use of both in the same sentence as a kind of intensification of the dative/indirect object:
 In Standard Italian: a me piace or mi piace ("I like it"; literally, "it pleases me")
 In Tuscan: a me mi piace or a me mi garba ("I like it")

This usage is widespread throughout the central regions of Italy, not only in Tuscany, and is often considered redundant and erroneous by language purists. It is also a standard feature in Spanish: a mí me gusta ("I like it")

In some dialects the double accusative pronoun me mi vedi (lit: You see me me) can be heard,  but it is considered an archaic form.

Masculine definite articles

The singular provokes lengthening of the following consonant:  'the dog', whereas the plural permits consonant weakening:  'the dogs'. As in Italian, masc. sing.  lo occurs before consonants long by nature or not permitting  in clusters (lo zio 'the uncle', lo studente 'the student'), though forms such as i zio can be heard in rustic varieties.

Noi + impersonal si
A morpholosyntactic phenomenon found throughout Tuscany is the personal use of the particle identical to impersonal si (not to be confused with passive si or the reflexive si), as the first person plural. It is basically the same as the use of on in French.

It's possible to use the construction si + third person in singular verb, which can be preceded by the first plural person pronoun noi. 
 Standard Italian: Andiamo a mangiare (We're going to eat), Noi andiamo là (We go there)
 Tuscan: Si va a mangià (We're going to eat), Noi si va là (We go there)

The phenomenon is found in all verb tenses, including compound tenses. In these tenses, the use of si requires a form of essere (to be) as auxiliary verb. If the verb is one that otherwise selects auxiliary avere in compound constructions, the past participle does not agree with the subject in gender and number:
 Italian: Abbiamo mangiato al ristorante.
 Tuscan: S'è mangiato al ristorante.
If the verb normally requires essere, the past participle is marked as plural:
 Italian: Siamo andati al cinema.
 Tuscan: S'è andati al cinema.

Usually si contracts before è: si è → s'è.

Fo (faccio) and vo (vado)
Another morphological phenomenon present in Tuscan is what might appear to be shortening of first singular verb forms in the present tense of fare (to do, to make)  and andare (to go).
 Fare: It. faccio  Tusc. fo (I do, I make)
 Andare: It. vado  Tusc. vo (I go)

These forms have two origins. A case such as Latin: sapio > Italian so (I know), however, admits no such phonological account: the expected outcome of  would be *, with a normal lengthening of the consonant preceding yod.

What seems to have taken place is a realignment of the paradigm in accordance with the statistically minor but highly frequent paradigms of dare (give) and stare (be, stay). Thus so, sai, sa, sanno (all singulars and 3rd personal plural of 'know') come to fit the template of do, dai, dà, danno ('give'), sto, stai, sta, stanno ('be, stay'), and fo, fai, fa, fanno ('make, do') follows the same pattern. The form vo, while quite possibly a natural phonological development, seems to have been reinforced by analogy in this case.

Loss of infinitival "-re" 
A phonological phenomenon that might appear to be a morphological one is the loss of the infinitival ending -re of verbs.
 andàre → andà
 pèrdere → pèrde
 finìre → finì

Stress remains on the same vowel that is stressed in the full form, so that the infinitive can come to coincide with various conjugated singulars: pèrde 'to lose', pèrde 's/he loses'; finì 'to finish', finì 's/he finished'. This homophony seldom, if ever, causes confusion, as they usually appear in distinct syntactic contexts.

While the infinitive without -re is universal in some subtypes such as Pisano-Livornese, in the vicinity of Florence alternations are regular, so that the full infinitive (e.g. vedere 'to see') appears when followed by a pause, and the clipped form (vedé) is found when phrase internal. The consonant of enclitics is lengthened if preceded by stressed vowel (vedéllo 'to see it', portàcci 'to bring us'), but not when the preceding vowel of the infinitive is unstressed (lèggelo 'to read it', pèrdeti 'to lose you').

A similar process is found in Romanian, with infinitives cited as a ("to") + the verb with the final -re lost. As in Tuscan, the stress falls on the same syllable that possessed it before the loss of -re.

In Catalan and its dialects and among some Portuguese speakers, final infinitive -r is not pronounced, so anar is realised as /ə'na/, as well as in Campidanese Sardinian.

Lexicon

The biggest differences among dialects is in the lexicon, which also distinguishes the different subdialects.
The Tuscan lexicon is almost entirely shared with standard Italian, but many words may be perceived as obsolete or literary by non-Tuscans. There are a number of strictly regional words and expressions too.

Characteristically Tuscan words:

 accomodare (which means "to arrange" in standard Italian) for riparare (to repair)
 babbo (standard form in Italian before the French loanword papa) for papà (dad)
 billo for tacchino (turkey)
 bove (literary form in standard Italian) for bue (ox)
 cacio for formaggio (cheese), especially for Pecorino
 calzoni  (literary form in standard Italian) for pantaloni (trousers)
 camiciola for canottiera (undervest)
 cannella (literary form in standard Italian) for rubinetto (tap)
 capo (literary form in standard Italian) and chiorba for testa (head)
 cencio for straccio (rag, tatters) (but also straccio is widely used in Tuscany)
 chetarsi (literary form in standard Italian) or chetassi for fare silenzio (to be silent)
 codesto (literary form in standard Italian) is a pronoun which specifically identifies an object far from the speaker, but near the listener (corresponding in meaning to Latin iste).
 costì or costà is a locative adverb which refers to a place far from the speaker, but near the listener. It relates to codesto as qui/qua relates to questo, and lì/là to quello
 desinare (literary form in standard Italian) for pranzare (to have lunch)
 diaccio for ghiacciato, freddo (frozen, cold)
 essi for sii (second-person singular imperative form of 'to be')
 furia (which means "fury" in standard Italian) for fretta (hurry)
 golpe or gorpe for volpe (fox)
 garbare for piacere (to like) (but also piacere is sometimes used in Tuscany)
 gota (literary form in standard Italian) for guancia (cheek)
 ire for andare (to go) (only some forms as ito (gone))
 lapis  for matita (pencil)
 popone for melone (cantaloupe)
 punto for per nulla or niente affatto (not at all) in negative sentences (cf. French ne ... point)
 rigovernare for lavare i piatti (to do/wash the dishes)
 sciocco (which means "silly" or "stupid" in standard Italian) for insipido (insipid)
 sistola for tubo da giardinaggio (garden hose)
 sortire for uscire (to exit) (cfr. French sortir)
 sudicio for spazzatura (garbage) as a noun and for sporco (dirty) as an adjective
 termosifone or radiatore for calorifero (radiator)
 tocco for le 13 (one p.m.), lunch time

See also
 Augusto Novelli, Italian playwright known for using the Tuscan dialect for 20th-century Florentine theater
 The Adventures of Pinocchio, written by Carlo Collodi in Italian but employing frequent Florentinisms

References

 Giannelli, Luciano. 2000. Toscana. Profilo dei dialetti, 9. Pisa: Pacini.

External links
 Atlante lessicale toscano (ALT) - Dialectometry
 The Linguasphere Register

Dialects of Italian
Tuscany